DAV Foundation is a blockchain-based open source global transportation company.

DAV Foundation has a decentralized transportation network, which enables different kinds of transportation companies to join the network. This network can work with autonomous vehicles, trucks, drones, cars, and rovers. The infrastructure enables users to access a network of autonomous vehicles using a single token.

The decentralized network being built by DAV is meant to offer an alternative to closed proprietary networks currently developed by automakers and transportation companies.

History 

DAV Network is a short form of Decentralized Autonomous Vehicle Network.It was founded in January 2017 by Noam Copel (CEO), Tal Ater (CTO), John Frazer and Joseph Lopardo. The foundation released and published its first code on GitHub. It also released its drone delivery application. The company was then granted non-profit organizations status in Switzerland.

Board of Advisors 

As of 2018, DAV Network has Dr. Alan Messer,  (former CTO at General Motors), Jerome Ferguson (Director of Autonomous System at UPS)  on its Board of Advisors.

Autonomous Vehicles Services 

A company can list its vehicles on the network for hiring purpose.The vehicles can be used to request a ride or deliver and pick up a package, after which DAV tokens are released to the company using Ethereum blockchain. The payments can be cleared once the service is done.

The blockchain will help the DAV vehicles to navigate themselves to provide service for the nearest available request. For every service, DAV tokens are credited to the service provider. Owner can earn DAV tokens through leasing the self-driven or manned car.

References 

Non-profit organisations based in Switzerland
Organizations established in 2017
2017 establishments in Switzerland